The Rialzi 4x4 Panda Raid is an annual amateur 3,000 km car racing rally of 4x4 Fiat Panda vehicles from Madrid, Spain, to Marrakesh, Morocco.  It is sponsored by Rialzi 4x4, an Italian racing maintenance company.  The speed and time of arrival are not important; the goal of the rally is to reach the finish line.

Rialzi4x4 supplies participants with Panda cars manufactured before 2003 and maintenance kits. Each team has a driver and co-driver.   Teams do not have Internet access, GPS, or mechanical support people.   Drivers stop in villages along their routes to interact with locals and distribute gifts donated by their fans.

The Panda Raid rally is reserved for 4x4 and 4x2 Panda cars models made earlier than 2003.  Each car has a 1.1-litre F.I.R.E. engine, chunky tires, a towbar, mudflaps and a bonnet that is raised at the rear for extra cooling. In its recent years, vintage 4x4 Panda cars with 0.9 TwinAir Turbo engine were allowed to compete.

References 

Motor racing
Intercontinental Rally Challenge